Cory L. Richards (born 1948 in Omaha, Nebraska; died April 4, 2013 in Washington, District of Columbia) was an American activist for birth control and abortion rights. He worked for the Guttmacher Institute, which he first joined in 1975 as a policy analyst. He was appointed vice president for public policy in 1988, senior vice president in 2000 and executive vice president in 2008. 

In 1994 Richards spearheaded the report Uneven and Unequal, which brought the issue of gaps in insurance coverage for contraceptives to public debate. In 1998 he founded the Guttmacher Policy Review, a quarterly journal that analyzes sexual and reproductive health and rights issues. He also volunteered with NARAL Pro-Choice America, the National Abortion Federation, and National Family Planning and Reproductive Health Association and Sexuality Information and Education Council of the U.S. (SIECUS).

He died in 2013 of pancreatic cancer at the age of 64. His ashes are interred at Oak Hill Cemetery, Washington DC.

References

Deaths from pancreatic cancer
American feminists
American birth control activists
American abortion-rights activists
People from Omaha, Nebraska
1948 births
2013 deaths